SB-242084 is a psychoactive drug and research chemical which acts as a selective antagonist for the 5HT2C receptor. It has anxiolytic effects, and enhances dopamine signalling in the limbic system, as well as having complex effects on the dopamine release produced by cocaine, increasing it in some brain regions but reducing it in others. It has been shown to increase the effectiveness of the selective serotonin reuptake inhibitor (SSRI) class of antidepressants, and may also reduce their side effects. In animal studies, SB-242084 produced stimulant-type activity and reinforcing effects, somewhat similar to but much weaker than cocaine or amphetamines.

See also 
 CEPC
 RS-102221
 SB-243213

References 

5-HT2C antagonists
Chloroarenes
Indoles
Ureas
Pyridines